Gentle (Nezhno Abidemi) is a mutant fictional character appearing in American comic books published by Marvel Comics. The character has been depicted as a member of the student body of the Xavier Institute.

Fictional character biography

Xavier Institute/M-Day 
Prior to M-Day, he was part of Storm's unseen squad.  He kept his powers in the wake of M-Day, and thus still resides at the Xavier Institute.

Emma Frost told him to step out from a sparring match to determine who would become the team of X-Men trainees.

It is later noted that Nezhno is from Wakanda, and he was the only student allowed to attend the wedding of Storm and the king of Wakanda, the Black Panther.

Quest for Magik 
Nezhno is among the students who are listening to Blindfold's story about Magik, Belasco and Limbo. He, with the other students are transported to Limbo. It is revealed that Nezhno's code-name is Gentle and he has the ability to temporarily increase the mass of his muscles.

Messiah Complex
During his return to the school after Limbo, Nezhno went into a deep meditative state to calm himself and to pray about his "violence" in defense of his friends. It was at this point that he revealed that his power was a dangerous one, and that it would eventually take his life.
He also retained his calm while fellow student Pixie, whom he had saved in Limbo, showed obvious interest in him.

This was nothing more, however, than a calm before the storm because soon he was thrust head first into a life changing battle when the O*N*E Sentinel went rogue and attempted to not only destroy the Xavier Institute but to kill him and his fellow students. Springing into action Nezhno used his power like never before and increased his muscle mass, height, and weight to dangerous degrees. Despite the health risks and being told to stay put by headmaster Scott Summers, he jumped into the fray and may have saved many lives by his intervention. Despite knowing that his life may be forfeit he did his best to halt the Sentinels and was apparently neutralized by one and lay depowered and unconscious on the battlefield.

Nezhno proved himself quite durable however and was not seen in the infirmary with the sick and injured but turned up in defense of his sick friends when Predator X attacked the school looking for an easy meal. Nezhno and Armor use a combination of their powers to hold off the beast while Pixie teleports them to what remains of Muir Island. Once there they continue their fight with the monster.

Divided We Stand
Just three days after the events of Messiah Complex, Nezhno decided to head back to his homeland, Wakanda. He was relieved to be free of the pestering of his former classmates, saying that they "nearly destroyed [him] with their insanity". During his return however, he found himself ostracized not only by his fellow Wakandans, but also by his own mother - due to the facts that his biological father was Russian, and therefore he is only seen as an outsider to his people. He then reflects that the only people who accepted him were the New X-Men, and he regrets having pushed them away.

Worlds Apart
Nezhno kills a Wakandan priest and is then placed in jail; however, Storm doesn't believe he is responsible until she is shown security footage of the act taking place. Ororo notices Nezhno acting out of character when he winks at the camera. She asks him to wink for her but he doesn't know what it is so Ororo has him freed declaring him innocent. Later the Black Panther orders his execution and winks at Ororo. It is revealed Shadow King is the one framing Nezhno.

Manifest Destiny and Utopia
Neznho moves to San Francisco along with the rest of the X-Men.

After Norman Osborn declares martial law on San Francisco and the X-Men fight the Dark Avengers, Cyclops moves the mutants to an artificial island off the coast of San Francisco named Utopia. Later, Nezhno is seen sharing is power with Rogue along with other students in order to fend off an attack on Utopia by Predators X. Nezhno is also seen in the aftermath of the Age of X crossover comforting Pixie, after reality is restored in Utopia.

Jean Grey School
When a rogue sentinel attacks the island nation of Utopia in the X-Men: Schism storyline, Nezhno, Generation Hope and other students join the fight. Soon after, he chooses Wolverine's side and departs back to Westchester, to enroll in the newly created Jean Grey School. During this time, he was also mentally controlled by Quentin Quire (Kid Omega).

X-Men: Red Team
Some time later, after Jean Grey is resurrected, he joins her newly created Red Team, along with Storm, Namor and new character Trinary.

Dawn of X
He also cameos with other mutants (Frenzy, Storm, Bling! and Prodigy) in T'Challa's line of defense of Wakanda against an invasion.

During the arc The Long Shadow, Black Panther (T'Challa) visits a terraformed planet Mars to talk to his ex-wife Storm. A secret meeting between T'Challa and Gentle reveals that Nezhno had been part of a Wakandan sleeper agent program.

Powers and abilities
Nezhno has the ability to temporarily increase the muscle mass of his body to extreme levels. He can will himself to immediately grow and strengthen to the extent that he can lift at least 100 tons.  
However, he cannot sustain this form for long since it causes massive strain on his body and leads to seizures.  After Belasco had kidnapped the New X-Men to Limbo, Nezhno was able to protect Pixie and defeat N'astirh before passing out. The vibranium tattoos adorning his body help to keep his powers in check, but Nezhno indicated that eventually his powers may kill him. When his powers are in use his vibranium tattoos glow. These tattoos are actually Vibranium-based paints that were intended to be fused with his skin.

Nezhno was excused from Emma's New X-Men brawl for his own safety and only participated in minimal violence while in Limbo. He saves this power for emergencies as it can only be used for a short period of time. He had said that he lacked any sense of touch, but it is possible that he might have felt Mercury touch him at some point. It was later revealed that his pain at power use & his touch insensitivity stemmed from a subconscious form of self-restraint he placed on himself due to the verbal and physical abuse he suffered from his mother. When Jean Grey helped to remove these psychological scars it enabled Nezhno to use his powers without any detriment and restored his sense of touch. According to Jean Grey, Gentle is powerful enough to go toe-to-toe with the Hulk if he could just will it.

Personality and beliefs
Nezhno is a calm and passive individual. Though not cold, he does not speak much. He seems to hold strong pacifistic beliefs and refrains from any sort of violence, though those may originate from the self-lethal nature of his mutation. His codename spawns from these beliefs. Likewise, he only uses his powers "in emergencies". He also looks similar to the character Requiem who appeared in The Uncanny X-Men #382 as part of the Neo Lost Souls.

Other versions

Age of X
In the Age of X reality, Gentle is seen as an inhabitant of Fortress X.

References

External links
 Gentle at Marvel.com

Comics characters introduced in 2006
Fictional characters with superhuman durability or invulnerability
Marvel Comics characters with superhuman strength
Marvel Comics male superheroes
Marvel Comics mutants
Wakandans